Broughton Island is an island in the Broughton Archipelago of the Queen Charlotte Strait area of the Central Coast of British Columbia, located northwest of Gilford Island.

Broughton Lagoon is a shallow inlet on the north side of Broughton Island, located at 

To the north of Broughton Island is North Broughton Island.

Name origin
, Vancouver's ship, and HMS Chatham under Broughton were anchored off the south shore of this island on July 28, 1792.

See also
 Broughton (disambiguation)
 Broughton Island (disambiguation)

References

Central Coast of British Columbia
Islands of British Columbia